Warisan Furniture is a manufacturer specialised in contract Indoor/Outdoor furniture for the Hospitality & Residential sector. Headquartered in Bali, the company has been founded by 2 Italians.

History 
Based in Bali, Indonesia the Italian founders Gianpaolo Nogara and Lucio Brissolese established Warisan in 1989. First as purveyors of antiques, they progressively created a modern teak and mahogany furniture manufacturer for boutique hotels, resorts and private residences.

Structure 

Manufactured in East java & Bali, Warisan employs over 450 people (including approximately 400 in Indonesia). Warisan uses solid plantation hardwoods from Perum Perhutani (Indonesian government owned and maintained plantations) certificates available. while being able to work with other raw material such as mindi wood, stones, seashells, coconut, bamboo, rattan, and polyrattan.

References 

Furniture companies of Indonesia
Indonesian brands